Bill Box (11 June 1938 – 8 July 2006) is a former Australian rules footballer who played with Essendon in the Victorian Football League (VFL). He was later captain-coach of Whitton, Culcairn - 1967, Barham, Henty and The Rock.

Notes

External links 
		

Essendon Football Club past player profile

2006 deaths
1938 births
Australian rules footballers from New South Wales
Essendon Football Club players